The Fessenden Elementary School is a historic school established previously known as Fessenden Academy in the outskirts of Ocala, Florida, between Martin and Zuber. It is part of the Marion County Public Schools district.

A school has existed at the current location since 1868, when Fessenden was founded as a private academy for African-American students.

History
In 1868, the school that would become Fessenden Academy was founded by a group of freedmen led by Thomas B. Ward. The school was initially staffed by young, white women from the northeast and Florida. The first African American teacher was appointed in 1877. Ferdinand S. Fessenden, upon seeing the conditions of the school while on a walk in 1890, agreed to build a two-story building as well as provide desks and learning materials. Two years later, Fessenden deeded the school in 1892, under the auspices of the American Missionary Association of the Congregational Church. There is a memorial stone to F. S. Fessenden on the school grounds, and he is presumed to be buried under this memorial.  The main building was built in 1909 with funding from philanthropist Andrew Carnegie. Joseph L. Wiley, principal of Fessenden, was responsible for securing the $6,500 grant. This funding, plus $1,500 raised in donations, built the main building that included the library, accommodations for female boarders, a dining hall and more classrooms. Fessenden Academy ceased operations in 1951, when the school became part of the Marion County School System.

Alumni
Ruby McCollum

Archival material

 In the American Missionary Association archives, Amistad Research Center, Tulane University, there are 37 boxes of records of the Fessenden Academy, 1911–1964. They include individual student files, budgets, and school publications.

See also

 Howard Academy

References

External links
 
 1909 picture of Fessenden Academy

Buildings and structures in Ocala, Florida
National Register of Historic Places in Marion County, Florida
Historic districts on the National Register of Historic Places in Florida
Schools in Marion County, Florida
Historically segregated African-American schools in Florida